Solyanka (initially селя́нка;  in English "Settlers' Soup") is a thick and sour soup of Russian origin that is common in Russia, Ukraine, Belarus, and other states of the former Soviet Union and certain parts of the former Eastern Bloc. It was one of the most popular dishes of the former East Germany.

Overview
There are three basic types of solyanka, with the main ingredient being either meat, fish, or mushrooms. All of them contain pickled cucumbers with brine, and often cabbage, salted mushrooms, potatoes, smetana (sour cream), and dill. The soup is prepared by cooking the cucumbers with brine before adding the other ingredients to the broth.

 For meat solyanka, ingredients like beef, ham, sausages, chicken breast  together with cucumber pickles, tomatoes, onions, olives, capers, allspice, parsley, and dill are all cut fine and mixed in a pot. The broth is added, and heated for a short time on the stove, without boiling.
 Fish solyanka is prepared similarly, but soup vegetables are cooked in the broth. The meat is replaced with fish such as sturgeon, salmon, and freshwater crayfish. Finally, some lemon juice is added to the soup.
 For mushroom solyanka, cut cabbage is heated in butter together with vinegar, tomatoes, cucumber pickles, and a little brine. Separately, mushrooms and onions are heated, and grated lemon zest is added. Cabbage and mushrooms are added in layers, breadcrumbs and butter are added, and the soup is briefly baked.

Solyanka is also popular in the former East Germany (the current German states of Brandenburg, Mecklenburg-Vorpommern, Saxony, Saxony-Anhalt, and Thuringia, along with the eastern half of Berlin), where it is commonly found in restaurants and available in canned form in grocery stores. The former German Chancellor Angela Merkel, who was raised in East Germany, is fond of Solyanka.

See also

 Borshch
 Rassolnik
 Shchi
 List of Russian dishes
 List of soups

References

Russian soups
Soviet cuisine
Latvian cuisine
Ukrainian cuisine
German cuisine